People awarded the Honorary citizenship of the City of Sofia, Bulgaria are:

Honorary Citizens of Sofia
Listed by date of award:

References

Honorary citizens of Sofia
Sofia